Jumeirah Golf Estates is a rapid transit station on the Red Line of the Dubai Metro in Dubai, UAE, serving Jumeirah Golf Estates.

The metro station opened on 1 October 2021 as part of Route 2020, (the same as when Expo 2020 was open) created to link central Dubai to the Expo 2020 exhibition site. The schedule has been delayed due to the Covid-19 pandemic.

The station is one of two underground stations on Route 2020, along with the Dubai Investment Park metro station. It is located at Jumeirah Golf Estates. Facilities included bus stops, disabled parking, retail units, and a taxi drop-off zone.

References

Railway stations in the United Arab Emirates opened in 2021
Dubai Metro stations